Domingo Amaizón Mastroianni (born 22 April 1936) is an Argentine middle-distance runner. He competed in the men's 3000 metres steeplechase at the 1968 Summer Olympics.

References

External links

1936 births
Living people
Athletes (track and field) at the 1968 Summer Olympics
Argentine male middle-distance runners
Argentine male steeplechase runners
Olympic athletes of Argentina
Athletes (track and field) at the 1959 Pan American Games
Athletes (track and field) at the 1967 Pan American Games
Pan American Games medalists in athletics (track and field)
Pan American Games bronze medalists for Argentina
Medalists at the 1967 Pan American Games
20th-century Argentine people